Kristen Barbara (born October 30, 1992) is a Canadian ice hockey defenceman, currently playing for the Metropolitan Riveters in the Premier Hockey Federation (PHF).

Playing career 

Across five years with the York Lions women's ice hockey program, Barbara played 120 games, putting up 71 points. In 2012, she was named to the CIS All-Rookie Team, and would be recognised with CIS All-Canadian honours in 2015. She was captain of the team in her final season.

Barbara was drafted 28th overall by the Brampton Thunder in the 2016 CWHL Draft. Across three Canadian Women's Hockey League (CWHL) seasons with the Thunder franchise, Barbara played 58 games, putting up 19 points. In 2018, she was a member of the Clarkson Cup-winning Markham Thunder team.

After spending the 2019–20 season with the PWHPA as an independent member, Barbara was announced as one of the first five players to sign with the Toronto Six, the first NWHL expansion team in Canada.

Personal life 

Outside of hockey, Barbara is training to be a firefighter. She has a degree in sociology from York University.

Career statistics  
Note:  Brampton Thunder changed their name to Markham Thunder in 2017.

Awards and Honours
 2011-2012 OUA All-Rookie Team & OUA Second Team All-Star
 2011-2012 CIS All-Rookie Team
 2011-2012 York Lions Athletics Female Rookie of the Year
 2013-2014 OUA Second Team All-Star 
 2014-2015 OUA First Team All-Star
 2014-2015 CIS First Team All-Star & All Canadian
 2017-2018 Clarkson Cup Champion

References

External links
 

1992 births
Living people
Ice hockey people from Ontario
Sportspeople from Hamilton, Ontario
Canadian women's ice hockey defencemen
Toronto Six players
Professional Women's Hockey Players Association players
Markham Thunder players
York Lions women's ice hockey players